Subhavaartha Television is a Telugu Christian devotional channel launched in 2008 by Goodnews Pvt. Ltd. It is a leading Telugu devotional TV channel. It is available on cable, DTH and IPTV platforms in India, and can also be watched via iOS, BlackBerry and Android devices.

Reach
The channel is available in many countries of Asia, Africa and Europe, and also in many island countries.

See also
 List of Telugu-language television channels

References

Telugu-language television channels
Television channels and stations established in 2008
2008 establishments in India